Equisetum arvense, the field horsetail or common horsetail, is an herbaceous perennial plant in the Equisetidae (horsetails) sub-class, native throughout the arctic and temperate regions of the Northern Hemisphere. It has separate sterile non-reproductive and fertile spore-bearing stems growing from a perennial underground rhizomatous stem system. The fertile stems are produced in early spring and are non-photosynthetic, while the green sterile stems start to grow after the fertile stems have wilted and persist through the summer until the first autumn frosts. It is sometimes confused with mare's tail, Hippuris vulgaris.

This allows this species to tolerate many conditions and is hard to get rid of even with the help of herbicides.

Taxonomy
Linnaeus described field horsetail with the binomial Equisetum arvense in his Species Plantarum of 1753. The specific epithet arvense is from the Latin "arvum", meaning "ploughed", referencing the growth of the plant in arable soil or disturbed areas. The common name "common horsetail" references the appearance of the plant that when bunched together appears similar to a horse's tail.

Many species of horsetail have been described and subsequently synonymized with E. arvense. One of these is E. calderi, a small form described from Arctic North America.

Description
Equisetum arvense creeps extensively with its slender and felted rhizomes that freely fork and bear tubers. Some stems can have as many as 20 segments. The solid and simple branches are ascending or spreading, with sheaths that bear attenuate teeth. The fertile stems are typically precocious and appear in early spring. It has changed little from its ancestors of the Carboniferous period.

The plant is difficult to control due to its extensive rhizomes and deeply buried tubers. Fire, mowing, or slashing is ineffective at removing the plant as new stems quickly grow from the rhizomes. Some herbicides remove aerial growth but regrowth quickly occurs albeit with a reduction in frond density.

E. arvense is a nonflowering plant, multiplying through spores. It absorbs silicon from the soil, which is rare among herbs. It has a very high diploid number of 216 (108 pairs of chromosomes).

Habitat and distribution

It commonly occurs in damp and open woodlands, pastures, arable lands, roadsides, disturbed areas, and near the edge of streams. It prefers neutral or slightly basic clay loams that are sandy or silty, especially where the water table is high, though it can occur occasionally on slightly acid soils.

The plant is widespread in the northern hemisphere, growing as far as 83° North in North America and 71° North in Norway, Sweden, Finland, and Russia and as far south as Texas, India and Iran. It is less widespread in the southern hemisphere, but it occurs in Argentina, Brazil, Chile, Madagascar, Indonesia, Australia and New Zealand.

Uses

The plant contains several substances that can be used medicinally. It is rich in silicon (10%), potassium, calcium, manganese, magnesium and phosphorus, phytosterols, dietary fiber, vitamins A, E and C, tannins, alkaloids, saponins, flavonoids, glycosides and caffeic acid phenolic ester. The buds are eaten as a vegetable in Japan and Korea in spring. All other Equisetum species are toxic.  

In polluted conditions, it may synthesize nicotine. Externally it was traditionally used for chilblains and wounds. It was also once used to polish pewter and wood (gaining the name pewterwort) and to strengthen fingernails. It is also an abrasive. It was used by hurdy-gurdy players to dress the wheels of their instruments by removing resin build up.

In horticulture and agriculture, an aqueous extract of E. arvense has been approved for use as a fungicide in the European Union and the United Kingdom (since Brexit). Horsetail extract can be used to control a range of important fungal pathogens on crops, including:

 Damping off (Pythium) and powdery mildew on cucumbers.
 Various fungal diseases of fruit trees, including scab (Venturia inaequalis), mildew, and peach leaf curl (Taphrina deformans).
 Both downy and powdery mildew on grapevines.
 Early blight (Alternaria solani) and Septoria blight (Septoria lycopersici) on tomatoes.
 Grey mould, powdery mildew, red core, and anthracnose fruit rot (Colletotrichum acutatum) in strawberries.
 Early blight, late blight, and powdery mildew on potatoes.

Equisetum is used in biodynamic farming (preparation BD 508) in particular to reduce the effects of excessive water around plants (such as fungal growth). The high silica content of the plant reduces the impact of moisture.

E. arvense has been used in traditional Austrian herbal medicine internally as tea, or externally as baths or compresses, for treatment of disorders of the skin, locomotor system, kidneys and urinary tract, rheumatism and gout.

Recent research has shown limited evidence of anti-inflammatory, diuretic, antimicrobial, and antioxidant properties.

Harmful effects
Equisetum arvense is toxic to stock, particularly horses.

It was introduced into New Zealand in the 1920s and was first identified as an invasive species there by Ella Orr Campbell in 1949. It is listed on the National Pest Plant Accord, prohibiting its sale, spread and cultivation.

References

External links

 Une entreprise en procès pour avoir commercialisé de la prêle 
 Horsetail at Medline
 Field Horsetail at Biosecurity New Zealand
 Washington Native Plant Society
 Short Notes of Equisetum arvense, IEA Paper 2018

arvense
Plants described in 1753
Medicinal plants of Asia
Medicinal plants of Europe
Medicinal plants of North America
Invasive plant species in New Zealand
Flora of England
Flora of Europe
Flora of Saint Pierre and Miquelon